Hans Kelderman (born 22 March 1966 in Zutphen) is a Dutch rower.

References 
 
 

1966 births
Living people
Dutch male rowers
People from Zutphen
Sportspeople from Gelderland
Rowers at the 1988 Summer Olympics
Rowers at the 1992 Summer Olympics
World Rowing Championships medalists for the Netherlands
Olympic rowers of the Netherlands
20th-century Dutch people
21st-century Dutch people